Francis Grey may refer to:
Francis William Grey (1860–1939), British-born Canadian writer and academic
Francis Richard Grey (1813–1890), son of Charles Grey, 2nd Earl Grey
Francis Grey, a Batman character

See also
Frances Grey (disambiguation)
Francis Gray (disambiguation)